"Ready" is a song recorded by Canadian singer and songwriter Alessia Cara. It was released on July 22, 2019, as the lead single from her 2019 EP This Summer.

Background and promotion
On July 18, 2019, Cara took to social media to reveal the release date and cover art of the song, explaining that she "caught the writing bug out of the blue". She further stated that the release would mark the first of more songs leading up to the release of the EP. She performed the song live for the first time during her opening gig of Shawn Mendes' self-titled tour on July 23, 2019.

Critical reception
Ryan Reed of Rolling Stone described the song as "a reggae-pop groove built on booming drum fills and buzzing synths". Rania Aniftos at Billboard complimented the song for being an "empowering tune about choosing not to stick around with someone who's not ready for commitment". Writing for Complex, Hannah Lifshutz found that the lyrics depict "a different kind of breakup, one that allows you to walk away feeling empowered".

Credits and personnel
Credits adapted from Tidal.
 Alessia Cara – songwriting, lead vocals
 Jon Levine – songwriting, production, bass guitar, guitar, drum programming
 Midi Jones – production, bass guitar, guitar, drum programming
 Olivia Aita – background vocals
 Chris Gehringer – mastering, studio personnel
 Matty Green – mixing, studio personnel
 Darwin Derequito – engineering, studio personnel

Charts

References

2019 singles
2019 songs
Alessia Cara songs
Songs written by Alessia Cara
Songs written by Jon Levine
Song recordings produced by Jon Levine